Obrovac may refer to:

Places 

Obrovac, Croatia, a town in Croatia
Obrovac, Serbia, a village in Serbia
Obrovac, Bosnia and Herzegovina, a village in Bosnia and Herzegovina

People 
Ivan Obrovac (born 1986), Serbian football Midfielder, who plays for Mačva Šabac
Tamara Obrovac (born 1962), Croatian ethno jazz singer, flutist, songwriter and composer

See also
Obrov (disambiguation)